Princetown is a town in Victoria, Australia, located on the Great Ocean Road, east of the Twelve Apostles, in the Corangamite Shire.

General
It hosts a pub which doubles as a general store, a post office and some accommodation options. The hamlet provides access to beaches and the mouth of the Gellibrand River. Redrawing of the census lines reduced the figure in 2016 to 241 persons.
Princetown Cricket Club is the sole surviving sporting club in the township, boasting about 30 members playing in the local South West Cricket Association. The current club was formed in 1968, but cricket had been played in Princetown as far back as 1886.

Attractions 
A river estuary and wetlands is adjacent to the township, with reed beds on the western branch of the estuary containing significant bird and plant life.  Princetown is bounded on two sides by national parks, with the Port Campbell National Park extending north-westerly and the Great Otway National Park to the south-east.

The Twelve Apostles rock formations are six kilometres to the west of Princetown, with the Gibson Steps also nearby.  The Loch Ard Gorge is just past the Twelve Apostles, towards Port Campbell.  In the other direction is Maits Rest Rainforest Walk.

References

External links

Official Website for 12 Apostles Region of Victoria

Towns in Victoria (Australia)
Shire of Corangamite
Coastal towns in Victoria (Australia)

fr:Princetown